The Nova Scotia Department of Education and Early Childhood Development is a department of the Government of Nova Scotia responsible for overseeing education institutions in the province. Becky Druhan is the current Minister of Education.

History
In 1949, a minister and deputy minister of education were appointed, and the former Council of Public Instruction (which oversaw the Education Office) was abolished. The Department of Education was established in 1953.

It was renamed Department of Education and Culture in 1994 when it took on the responsibilities of the former Department of Tourism and Culture. It was renamed Department of Education in 1999 when the tourism and culture portfolios were again made the responsibilities of a separate department.

In 2013, the department took over early childhood development services from the Department of Community Services, and gained its present name.

Mandate
The Department of Education mandate spans the education system from school entry through to all post-secondary destinations.

The education system is separated into public schools (Grades Primary to 12) and post-secondary (colleges and universities).

All children must begin school in the year they reach 5 years of age (Grade Primary).

Organizational structure

The Department of Education is headed by an elected official appointed by the Premier:

Minister of Education: Hon. Becky Druhan

and by a senior civil servant called a Deputy Minister:

Deputy Minister: Cathy Montreuil

The Department of Education is composed of several operational units, including:

Acadian and French Language Services
Public Schools
African Canadian Services
Education Quality Services
English Program Services
Equity and Special Projects
Evaluation Services
French Second Language Services
Learning Resources & Technology Services
Mi'kmaq Liaison Office
Regional Education Service
School Board Labour Relations
Student Services
Corporate Policy
Agencies, Boards and Commissions
Departmental Library
Freedom of Information and Protection of Privacy
Publishing
Corporate Services
Facilities Management
Finance
Information Technology
Statistics and Data Management
Teacher Certification
Higher Education
Post-secondary Disability Services
Private Career Colleges
Provincial Library
Student Assistance
Universities and Colleges

In 2008 the Department of Education underwent significant structural change with the creation of the new Department of Labour and Workforce Development. The former Skills and Learning branch has moved into this new department.

See also
School districts in Nova Scotia
Education in Canada
Nova Scotia Community College system

References

External links
 

1953 establishments in Nova Scotia
Education in Nova Scotia
Education and Early Childhood Development
Nova Scotia